Emmanouil Mallidis (born 1914, date of death unknown) was a Greek swimmer. He competed in the men's 100 metre backstroke at the 1936 Summer Olympics.

References

External links
 

1914 births
Year of death missing
Greek male swimmers
Olympic swimmers of Greece
Swimmers at the 1936 Summer Olympics
Place of birth missing
Male backstroke swimmers